Canadian Music Week (or CMW) is an industry conference and music festival held over ten days in Toronto and Ontario, Canada.

History
Canadian Music Week began in 1981 and has grown to become one of Canada's largest and most influential media and music conferences. It draws top industry professionals to participate in a four-day program of activities.

Designed to stimulate the exchange of market intelligence, increase dialogue and provide networking opportunities, Canadian Music Week continues to present the ideal platform for more than 3,000 national and international delegates.

CMW is the single longest running multi-day Canadian music and media event. It manages to consistently bring together more than 3,000 music industry professionals for the week's events – combining conferences, award shows and one of Canada's biggest "New Music" festivals.

Throughout the duration of the event, performers put on shows at venues ranging from popular bars and halls, to trendy clothing stores and cafes. Many emerging new bands use the festival as an opportunity to be spotted by the A&R representatives who are around in greater than average numbers during the festival. In January 2017, Jim Beam along with Canadian Music Week  Canada launched Jim Beam Make History Talent Search.

Notable participants
Notable speakers and performers who have been a part of the event include:
Slash, celebrity interview artist
Gene Simmons, celebrity interview artist
David Foster, celebrity interview record producer
Dennis DeYoung, celebrity interview artist/songwriter
Chuck D, keynote speaker artist/record producer
Stereos, pop-rock band
Alan Parsons, keynote speaker British record producer
Hollowphonic, an ambient, post-rock unit
Seymour Stein, president of Sire records
Trapt, a nu metal rock outfit
Public Enemy, hip hop group
Cassius Khan, Indian classical musician; The Ghazal Tabla Wizard
Wolfmother, rock band
MENEW, indie rock band
The Exies, an indie rock band
Glen Ballard, producer
Don Was, producer
Sturle Dagsland, Norwegian artist
Mark Hudson, producer
Mathew Knowles, keynote speaker – World Music Entertainment C.E.O.
Sir George Martin, producer
Jordan Galland, panel member, director/musician
Gastón Iungman, rock musician and producer;
Bullmoose, indie rock band.

Hall of Fame inductions

Canadian Indies Hall of Fame 
CMW honours important independent and alternative artists with its annual "Canadian Indies Hall of Fame" program. Artists who have been inducted into the Hall of Fame include Parachute Club, The Pursuit of Happiness, Martha and the Muffins, D.O.A. and Rough Trade.

Canadian Music Industry Hall of Fame 
The Canadian singer-songwriter Alanis Morissette was inducted into the Canadian Music Industry Hall of Fame at Canadian Music Week 2008.

Featured Cultural Spotlight performances
 2010 Spotlight on India – Rock Showcase featured a number of South-Asian-Canadian acts such as J'sin who performed tracks from his Fatlab's produced first album, Born.

Canadian Music Fest
Since 2009  Canadian Music Week has referred to the festival component of the event as Canadian Music Fest, which it calls "Canada's largest new music festival".

Startup Launchpad
In 2016, CMW hosted its first annual Startup Launchpad event, a pitch competition for startups in the music industry. Seven startups were selected to pitch their business to potential investors and a judging panel including Michael Wekerle and Ted Cohen. The first finalists of this event were Mugatunes, an intercollegiate music sharing site, Audiokite Research, a market research company for musicians, Mission Control, a music management platform, Aybo, Trebba and Notetracks, a music collaboration app.

Canadian Radio Music Awards

In 2016, the CMW launched an award show, called the Canadian Radio Music Awards. The show, similar to the Juno Awards, recognized and celebrated Canadian music artists. The award show has not been held since 2018.

See also

List of festivals in Canada
Music of Canada

References

External links
Canadian Music Week official website

Music conferences
Rock festivals in Canada
Music festivals in Toronto
Music festivals established in 1981
Pop music festivals in Canada